The  or the Jornal do Nikkey is a Japanese language newspaper published in Liberdade, São Paulo, Brazil. It is one of two Japanese newspapers published in that city, with the other being the São Paulo Shimbun. As of 2014 the head of the company is Raul Takaki (高木 ラウル Takaki Rauru). As of 2013 the chief editor is Masayuki Fukuzawa.

The newspaper distributes the Prêmio Paulista de Esporte along with the Jornal Nikkei.

History
It was founded in 1998 as a merger between the Diário Nippak and the Jornal Paulista. The former, headed by Toshihiko "Kan-chan" Nakabayashi (died in 1992 at 77 years of age), was founded in 1949 and the latter was founded in 1947.

The Nikkey Shimbun stated in 2013 that it has a daily run of 10,000 copies.

Jornal Nippak
Due to the aging of the immigrant Japanese community, the newspaper launched a weekly Portuguese edition, the Jornal Nippak, initially to reach children of Japanese immigrants. As of 2013 the chief editor is Aldo Shiguti. By the time the Jornal Nippak had been launched, there was already a Portuguese website. Raul Takaki stated that even though the Portuguese website existed, and that the other Japanese newspaper in the city also had one, the Nikkey Shimbun felt a need to make a Nissei-oriented daughter publication. Shiguti stated that Brazilians interested in Japanese culture have also bought copies of the Portuguese edition.

See also
 Japanese Brazilian
 Japanese community of São Paulo

References

Further reading

External links
  
  Jornal Nippak

Asian-Brazilian culture in São Paulo
Daily newspapers published in Brazil
Japanese-language newspapers
1998 establishments in Brazil
Newspapers established in 1998
Japanese-Brazilian culture
Mass media in São Paulo